Pak Afghan Clearing Football Club, known as PACA, is a Pakistani football club based in Chaman, Balochistan, Pakistan. The club compete in Football Federation League. They won the league in 2012–13, earning them the promotion to 2013–14 Pakistan Premier League.

Top flight
The club spent only one year in top-flight, after winning the 2012–13 Football Federation League. They finished 14th in the 2013–14 Pakistan Premier League and were relegated only one year in Pakistan Premier League.

Honours
 Football Federation League 
 Winners (1): 2012–13

External links

Club logo

Football clubs in Pakistan
Football in Chaman